The Blackledge River is a tributary of the Salmon River which courses  through eastern Connecticut in the United States.

Rising from Sperry Pond in Bolton, the Blackledge amasses waters from feeder creeks along its course before joining the Jeremy River in Colchester, Connecticut. Salmon River, considered a major tributary of the Connecticut River, begins at the confluence of the Blackledge and Jeremy.

There are frequent Class I-II whitewater rapids throughout the route to the Salmon River.

Bridges
Blackledge River Railroad Bridge
 Foot Bridge on Gay City State Park Red Trail (at southern border with Meshomasic State Forest)

See also
List of rivers of Connecticut
Gay City State Park

References

Rivers of Hartford County, Connecticut
Tributaries of the Connecticut River
Rivers of Connecticut